Capacity or capacities may 
refer to:

Mathematics, science, and engineering
 Capacity of a container, closely related to the volume of the container
 Capacity of a set, in Euclidean space, the total charge a set can hold while maintaining a given potential energy
 Capacity factor, the ratio of the actual output of a power plant to its theoretical potential output
 Storage capacity (energy), the amount of energy that the storage system of a power plant can hold
 Nameplate capacity, the intended full-load sustained output of a facility such as a power plant
 Heat capacity, a measurement of changes in a system's internal energy
 Combining capacity, another term for valence in chemistry
 Battery capacity, the amount of electric charge a battery can deliver at the rated voltage

Computer
 Data storage capacity, amount of stored information that a storage device or medium can hold
 Channel capacity, the highest rate at which information can be reliably transmitted

Social
 Carrying capacity, the population size of a species that its environment can sustain
 Capacity planning, the process of determining the production resources needed to meet product demand
 Capacity building, strengthening the skills, competencies and abilities of developing societies
 Productive capacity, the maximum possible output of an economy
 Capacity management, a process used to manage information technology in business
 Capacity utilization, the extent to which an enterprise or a nation uses its theoretical productive capacity
 Road capacity, the maximum traffic flow rate that theoretically may be attained on a given road
 Seating capacity, the number of people who can be seated in a specific space

Legal
 Capacity (law), the capability and authority to undertake a legal action

Arts
 Capacities (album), an album by Up Dharma Down
 Capacity (album), an album by Big Thief

See also
 
 Capacitance, in physics
Ability (disambiguation)
Cability (disambiguation)
Capacity (disambiguation)
Incapacitation (disambiguation)